The Gold: The Inside Story is a 2023 BBC crime documentary about the 1983 Brink's-Mat robbery, in which three tonnes of gold were stolen.

See also
The Gold (TV series), a 2023 BBC dramatisation of the robbery

References

External links

2023 British television series debuts
2020s British documentary television series
BBC television documentaries
English-language television shows